The Bologna Indoor is a defunct WCT and Grand Prix affiliated men's tennis tournament played from 1971 to 1981. It was held in Bologna in Italy and played on indoor carpet courts.

Results

Singles

Doubles

See also
 Bologna Outdoor

External links
 ATP tournament profile

Carpet court tennis tournaments
Indoor tennis tournaments
Defunct tennis tournaments in Italy
World Championship Tennis
Grand Prix tennis circuit